Nick Mason's Saucerful of Secrets are an English rock band formed in 2018 to perform the early music of Pink Floyd. The band comprises the Pink Floyd drummer and co-founder Nick Mason, the bassist Guy Pratt, the guitarists Gary Kemp and Lee Harris, and the keyboardist Dom Beken. As many fans had discovered Pink Floyd with their bestselling 1973 album The Dark Side of the Moon, Mason wanted to bring their earlier material to a wider audience.

The band made their debut in May 2018 at Dingwalls, London, before embarking on a European tour in September 2018 and a North American tour in 2019. A 2020 European tour was postponed due to the COVID-19 pandemic. In September 2020, the band released a live album and film, Live at the Roundhouse.

Formation 
Pink Floyd, one of the most commercially successful and influential rock bands of all time, were formed in London in 1965 by Syd Barrett (guitar, lead vocals), Nick Mason (drums), Roger Waters (bass guitar, vocals), and Richard Wright (keyboards, vocals). Barrett left in 1968, and was replaced by  David Gilmour; Waters left in 1985 and Wright died in 2008. 

While Gilmour and Waters continue to perform Pink Floyd material in their solo shows, Mason worked on Pink Floyd reissues and compilations. After assisting with Pink Floyd: Their Mortal Remains, a 2017 museum exhibition about Pink Floyd, Mason said: "You end up feeling like you belong to English Heritage. Everything you talk about and do is something that happened forty years ago. It was actually beginning to make me feel a bit old."

In 2018, the guitarist Lee Harris, formerly of the Blockheads, approached the bassist and Pink Floyd collaborator Guy Pratt about Mason forming a band to perform Pink Floyd's early psychedelic material, recorded while Barrett was the bandleader. The new band was joined by the vocalist and guitarist Gary Kemp of Spandau Ballet and the keyboardist Dom Beken, a collaborator of Wright. Pratt and Beken previously worked together in the electronic band Transit Kings. Mason stressed that Kemp was not "taking the place" of Barrett, but that "it was to do with who had the enthusiasm for it, and Gary did". According to Mason, in early rehearsals, "The interesting thing was that it all sort of began to sound good straight away. That was mainly, I think, driven by their enthusiasm."

As many fans had discovered Pink Floyd with their bestselling 1973 album The Dark Side of the Moon, Mason wanted to bring their earlier material to a wider audience. He said he did not want to perform as a tribute act similar to the Australian Pink Floyd Show or perform shows similar to those by Waters and Gilmour; the band wanted to "capture the spirit" of the music rather than recreate it. They received the blessings of Gilmour and Waters. The band takes its name from the second Pink Floyd album, A Saucerful of Secrets (1968).

Performances 

Nick Mason's Saucerful of Secrets made their debut at a sold-out test show at Dingwalls, a 500-seat club in London, in May 2018. This was followed by three small shows at the Half Moon, Putney, a European tour in September 2018, and a North American tour in 2019. On 18 April 2019, Waters surprised the audience at the New York Beacon Theatre by joining the band to sing "Set the Controls for the Heart of the Sun". A 2020 European tour was postponed to April 2022 due to the COVID-19 pandemic. A second North American tour was postponed from January 2022 to September.

Band members 
 Nick Mason – drums, gong, bell, percussion
 Guy Pratt – bass, vocals, occasional percussion
 Gary Kemp – guitars, vocals
  – guitars, backing vocals
 Dom Beken – keyboards, programming, backing vocals

Releases

In September 2020, the band released a live album and film, Live at the Roundhouse. A single featuring "See Emily Play" and "Vegetable Man" was released for Record Store Day.

Live at the Roundhouse track listing

Disc 1
"Interstellar Overdrive" (Syd Barrett, Roger Waters, Richard Wright, Nick Mason) – 5:49
"Astronomy Domine" (Barrett) – 4:11
"Lucifer Sam" (Barrett) – 3:12
"Fearless" (David Gilmour, Waters) – 5:02
"Obscured by Clouds" (Gilmour, Waters) – 4:27
"When You're In" (Gilmour, Waters, Wright, Mason) – 1:55
"Remember a Day" (Wright) – 3:32
"Arnold Layne" (Barrett) – 3:15
"Vegetable Man" (Barrett) – 2:27
"If" (Waters) – 1:55
"Atom Heart Mother" (Gilmour, Waters, Wright, Mason, Ron Geesin) – 7:14
"If (Reprise)" (Waters) – 1:52
"The Nile Song" (Waters) – 3:37

Disc 2
"Green Is the Colour" (Waters) – 4:07
"Let There Be More Light" (Waters) – 3:37
"Childhood's End" (Gilmour) – 3:33
"Set the Controls for the Heart of the Sun" (Waters) – 12:21
"See Emily Play" (Barrett) – 3:03
"Bike" (Barrett) – 2:23
"One of These Days" (Gilmour, Waters, Wright, Mason) – 5:57
"A Saucerful of Secrets" (Gilmour, Waters, Wright, Mason) – 9:17
"Point Me at the Sky" (Gilmour, Waters) – 3:12

References

External links

English rock music groups
Pink Floyd
Nick Mason
Musical groups established in 2018
2018 establishments in the United Kingdom